Right Now is an album by American jazz flautist Herbie Mann recorded in 1962 for the Atlantic label.

Reception

Allmusic awarded the album 3 stars stating "The flutist provided a very wide variety of music during his long stay at Atlantic; this rewarding 1962 LP found him combining bop with various forms of world music".

Track listing
All compositions by Herbie Mann except as indicated
 "Right Now" - 3:11
 "Desafinado" (Antônio Carlos Jobim, Newton Mendonça) - 4:21
 "Challil" - 4:36
 "Jumpin' With Symphony Sid" (Lester Young) - 2:56
 "Borquinho" (Roberto Menescal, Renaldo Boscoli) - 3:38
 "Cool Heat" - 5:11 
 "Manhã de Carnaval" (Luiz Bonfá) - 2:55
 "Meditation" (Jobim, Mendonça) - 5:52
 "Free for All" - 2:19
recorded in New York City on March 12, 1962 (tracks 5 & 7), March 28, 1962 (track 8), and April 19, 1962 (tracks 1-4, 6 & 9)

Personnel 
Herbie Mann - flute
Hagood Hardy - vibraphone
Billy Bean - guitar
Don Payne (tracks 5, 7 & 8),  Bill Salter (tracks 1-4, 6 & 9) - bass
Willie Bobo - drums
Carlos "Patato" Valdes - congas
Johnny Pacheco (tracks 5 & 7), Willie Rodriguez (tracks 5, 7 & 8) - percussion

References 

1962 albums
Herbie Mann albums
Albums produced by Nesuhi Ertegun
Atlantic Records albums